Martín García and Marcelo Melo were the defending champions, but García chose not to participate, and only Melo competed that year.
Melo partnered with André Sá, but lost in the first round to Travis Parrott and Filip Polášek.

Marc Gicquel and Jo-Wilfried Tsonga won in the final, 6–4, 6–3, against Fernando Verdasco and Mischa Zverev.

Seeds

Draw

Draw

External links
Draw

2009 ATP World Tour
Men's Doubles